Founded in 1888, the Football League is the oldest such competition in world football.  The 1888–89 Football League was the first edition of the Football League, which ran from the autumn of 1888 until the spring of 1889.  The Football League was formally created and named in Manchester during a meeting on 17 April 1888.

The season began on 8 September 1888 with 12 member clubs from the Midlands and North of England: Accrington, Aston Villa, Blackburn Rovers, Bolton Wanderers, Burnley, Derby County, Everton, Notts County, Preston North End, Stoke, West Bromwich Albion and Wolverhampton Wanderers.  Each club played the other twice, once at home and once away. The season concluded in 20 April 1889.

The original league rules stated that teams' positions should be calculated "from wins, draws, and losses", without further detail.  It was not until late November that a points system was decided upon, with teams being awarded two points for a win and one point for a draw.  Goal average was used to separate teams level on points.

League table
The league rules stated that the bottom four clubs were obliged to retire and seek re-election at the Annual General Meeting (AGM) along with any other clubs wishing to become League members.  Stoke, Burnley, Derby County, and Notts County were all re-elected for the 1889–90 season.

Results

Team locations

Individual statistics
Taken from Fußball-Weltzeitschrift, a journal of the International Federation of Football History & Statistics.

Top scorers

Best goalkeepers

Preston North End's champion squad
Preston North End's champion squad were known as The Invincibles.

The season

Sat 8 September 1888: Opening day
Ten of the twelve teams took part in the first ever round of Championship fixtures on Saturday, 8 September 1888 and although no league table was published in any of the newspapers of the time West Bromwich Albion would have been the very first table toppers.  By modern-day calculations, Derby County would have been the first ever table toppers because of their superior goal difference which was +3 after the first game.  Albion won 2–0 at Stoke in front of 4,500 spectators and would have headed Preston North End, Derby County and Everton by virtue of an infinite goal average as they kept a clean sheet. Goal Average was the number of goals scored divided by the number of goals conceded.  Goal Average was used to separate teams who were tied on points at that time. Preston defeated Burnley 5–2, Derby were 6–3 winners at Bolton and Everton secured the points in a 2–1 victory over Accrington. Aston Villa defender Gershom Cox was thought to have earned the distinction of scoring the first ever league goal with an unfortunate own goal in a 1–1 draw with Wolverhampton Wanderers and Fred Dewhurst opening the scoring minutes later at Preston with the first intentional goal. However the post-match reports of relative kick-off times show most games were delayed allowing for crowds to assemble. A goal by England and Bolton winger Kenny Davenport 2 minutes into the match against Derby County  was scored comfortably before any other and is now regarded as the first ever football league goal. Neither Blackburn Rovers or Notts County played on the opening weekend.

Sat 15: Preston go top of the League

Preston North End took over from West Bromwich Albion at the top of the table in their second game on Saturday 15 September 1888 when they won 4–0 at Wolverhampton Wanderers with Archie Goodall scoring on his Preston debut. Albion also won 2–1 at Derby County but the victory gave them an inferior goal average while Everton were the only other club to secure maximum points from their opening two games. Both Blackburn Rovers and Notts County made their respective football league debuts. Rovers were held 5–5 by Accrington while Notts County lost 1–2 at Everton.

Sat 22: Only Preston keep 100% record
A 2–6 defeat for West Bromwich Albion at Blackburn Rovers and a 1–2 defeat for Everton at Aston Villa left Preston as the only team with a 100% record after three games when they defeated Bolton Wanderers 3–1 at Deepdale. Stoke recorded their first ever league victory 3–0 over Notts County, who themselves replaced Stoke at the foot of the table. County had lost both their opening two fixtures while Bolton had yet to secure a point from three.

Sat 29 Preston maintain 100% record 
Preston's 100% record was maintained when they won 3–2 at Derby County while second placed Aston Villa set a record victory up to that time when they defeated bottom club Notts County 9–1. Bolton recorded their first ever league victory at the fourth attempt, 6–2 against Everton.

Sat 6 Oct Villa suffer first defeat of the season
Richard Whittle marked his Preston debut with a goal in their 7–0 victory over Stoke to take their perfect start to five games. Their lead at the top was doubled to two points when Aston Villa suffered their first defeat of the season 0–2 at Everton. West Bromwich Albion moved up to second after beating Derby County 5–0 while Notts County secured their first ever point at the fourth attempt in a 3–3 draw with Blackburn Rovers yet remained at the foot of the table.

Sat 13 October : Preston North End vs West Bromwich Albion
West Bromwich Albion visited Deepdale for the first ever league clash between teams occupying the top two positions at kick off. Albion trailed Preston by two points and required a six-goal victory to overtake the leaders on goal average but Preston stretched their perfect start to six games with a 3–0 victory. Aston Villa moved back into second place, three points behind Preston on the same day when they defeated Blackburn Rovers 6–1. Notts County became the last team to secure a victory when they defeated Everton 3–1 in what was their fifth game.

Sat 20: Accrington are first team to take a point from Preston
Accrington became the first team to gain a point against Preston when they held the league leaders to a 0–0 draw in what was their seventh game of the season. Aston Villa won 3–2 at Bolton to reduce Preston's lead to two points.

Sat 27 Wolves beaten at Deepdale
Preston North End extended their unbeaten start to the season to eight games when they defeated Wolverhampton Wanderers 5–2 at Deepdale with John Goodall scoring a hat-trick. Alex McKinnon earned the distinction of being the first player to score a league hat-trick for Everton in their 6–2 victory over Derby County who fell to the bottom of the league as a result of a sensational 6–1 victory for Notts County over Burnley. Blackburn Rovers also enjoyed a comprehensive 5–2 victory over Stoke to climb to sixth in the table.

Sat 3 November 1888: Preston stretch unbeaten start to nine
Preston stretched their unbeaten start to the season to nine games when Jack Gordon and John Goodall both scored hat-tricks in a 7–0 victory at Notts County. This was Goodall's second hat-trick in consecutive games and took Preston three points clear of Aston Villa who were held 1–1 at Stoke. Blackburn Rovers also scored seven goals away from home at Burnley, who did manage a goal in reply.

Saturday 10 November 1888: Preston North End vs Aston Villa
When Aston Villa visited Preston North End on Saturday 10 November 1888 it was both teams tenth game of their twenty-two game programme and the second time that two teams had played a fixture while occupying the top two positions in the league. Villa went into the game trailing Preston by three points but a 1–1 draw maintained the status quo. Aston Villa were the only team to stop Preston North End winning every home game this season. The Villa also went on to win every home game except one which was against Preston.

12 November 1888: Monday night football
Preston completed the first half of their program unbeaten when they won 3–0 at Stoke in the only fixture played that day. Ross, Thomson, Robertson scored for them. The result took Preston five points clear of second placed Aston Villa who held one game in hand.

Saturday 17 November 1888
Preston increased their lead to seven points with a 2–0 defeat of Accrington while Aston Villa were beaten 1–5 at Blackburn Rovers.

Saturday 24 November 1888
Blackburn Rovers completed a run of five straight victories when they won 2–0 at bottom club Derby to move into third place, eight points behind leaders Preston whose unbeaten start increased to thirteen games with a 5–2 victory at Bolton.

Saturday 8 December 1888

Bottom club Derby travelled to unbeaten league leaders Preston having not won in nine games, the last seven of which had all ended in defeat. Jock Inglis made his Preston debut and scored in their 5–0 victory

Saturday 15 December 1888
Preston North End were held to a draw for only the third time at the fifteenth attempt, 2–2 at Burnley. Their nearest challengers, Aston Villa were unable to make any impact into the seven-point deficit though as they too were held 1–1 at Accrington.

Saturday 22 December 1888
Preston's 3–0 defeat of Everton took their unbeaten start to the season to sixteen games.

Wednesday 26 December 1888
League leaders Preston travelled to West Bromwich Albion on Boxing Day winning 5–0 and, with Aston Villa not playing, they established a nine-point lead having played two games more.

Saturday 5 January 1889: Preston Champions
A 1–0 victory over Blackburn Rovers on 29 December took Preston North End into the new year still unbeaten with just four games remaining. Their first game of 1889 would be at home to Notts County in a game that would see them crowned champions of the inaugural league with three games to spare provided Aston Villa also lost at Burnley. Notts County arrived at Deepdale having failed to win in seven outings, the last five of which had all ended in defeat and rarely threatened as Preston ran out 4–1 winners. Aston Villa slumped to a 0–4 defeat at Burnley which saw Preston crowned champions. The Deepdale club remained unbeaten in their final three games to complete their league programme unbeaten.

See also

1888–89 in English football
1888 in association football
1889 in association football

References

External links
 

1888–89
1888–89 domestic association football leagues
League